The Malathyros executions refer to the mass execution by firing squad of 61 male civilians from the village of Malathyros in Crete, Greece by German forces on 28 August 1944 during World War II.

Background
During the Axis occupation of Crete, the village had a population of approximately 300 people who sheltered British SOE personnel and aided local resistance fighters.
Commander of the German garrison on Crete at the time was General Friedrich-Wilhelm Müller.

The executions
In the early morning of 28 August 1944, German forces surrounded Malathyros. Male villagers were dragged from their homes and herded to the school. For the entire day, they were interrogated to reveal the whereabouts of the British, but they refused to cooperate despite being tortured and brutally beaten. Near sunset, they were marched outside the village and shot in a nearby canyon. The village was looted.

Aftermath
The executions almost eradicated the male population of the village, leaving many women without any support in raising their orphaned children. No reparations were ever paid to the families of the victims.
One of the hostages, Giannis Kartsonakis (Γιάννης Καρτσωνάκης), survived the execution and the following coup de grâce and was later ordained Orthodox priest.

A monument commemorating the victims has been erected in the village square. A memorial service is held annually at the church.

On 16 December 1998, Malathyros was declared a martyred village (Presidential Decree 399, ΦΕΚ A 277/16.12.1998).

See also
Razing of Anogeia
Skourvoula executions
Viannos massacres
Holocaust of Kedros
Alikianos executions

References

External links 
German occupation of Crete: Malathiros (in German -- translate)

Mass murder in 1944
Nazi war crimes in Greece
1944 in Greece
Massacres in Greece during World War II
Massacres of men
Violence against men in Europe
August 1944 events
Crete in World War II
War crimes of the Wehrmacht